was a Japanese pathologist who carried out pioneering work into the causes of cancer.

 He was the first to prove chemical carcinogenesis.

He was the Nobel Prize nominee in 7 nominations.

Life 
Yamagiwa was born in Ueda, Nagano, the third son of the feudal retainer of the Ueda Domain in Shinano Province. He became the adopted son-in-law of Yoshiya Yamagiwa, a physician in Katsuya, Tokyo, and took the surname Yamagiwa. He completed his MD in 1888 from Imperial University of Tokyo. He was appointed as a professor at the Medical School, Imperial University of Tokyo and published his landmark work, Byōri Sōron Kōgi, in 1895.

Yamagiwa extensively promoted cancer research in Japan. In 1907 Cancer Science, peer-reviewed medical journal covering research in oncology, was first issued by him. In addition, he and his colleagues found the Japanese Foundation for Cancer Research in 1908.

He died in Tokyo of pneumonia in 1930 at the age of 67.

Contributions 
In a series of experiments conducted in 1915, Yamagiwa and his assistant Kōichi Ichikawa (1888–1948) induced squamous cell carcinomas on the ears of rabbits using coal tar, demonstrating the latter's carcinogenic properties.

Recognitions 
Yamagiwa and Ichikawa shared the Japan Academy Prize in 1919 for their work.

The 1926 Nobel Prize went to Johannes Andreas Grib Fibiger, for his discovery of Spiroptera carcinoma, a microbial parasite which Fibiger claimed was the cause of cancer. This "finding" was discredited by other scientists shortly thereafter. Two years later, Katsusaburo Yamagiwa successfully induced squamous cell carcinoma by painting crude coal tar on the inner surface of rabbits' ears. Yamagiwa's work has become the primary basis for this line of research. Because of this, some people consider Fibiger's Nobel Prize to be undeserved, particularly because Yamagiwa never received the prize for his work.

In 1966, the former committee member Folke Henschen advocated that Yamagiwa deserved the Nobel Prize, but it was not realized.

References

Japanese pathologists
Cancer researchers
1863 births
1930 deaths
Deaths from pneumonia in Japan
19th-century Japanese physicians
20th-century Japanese physicians
University of Tokyo alumni
Academic staff of the University of Tokyo
People from Nagano Prefecture